In linguistics, a chroneme is a basic, theoretical unit of sound that can distinguish words by duration only of a vowel or consonant. The noun chroneme is derived , and the suffixed -eme, which is analogous to the -eme in phoneme or morpheme. However, the term does not have wide currency and may be unknown even to phonologists who work on languages claimed to have chronemes.

Most languages have differences in length of vowels or consonants, but in the case of most languages it would not be treated phonemically or phonologically as distinctive or contrastive. Even in those languages which do have phonologically contrastive length, a chroneme is only posited in particular languages. This may be compared to the analysis of a diphthong like  as a single segment  or as the sequence of a vowel and consonant: .

For the purposes of analysis of a chronemic contrast, two words with different meaning that are spoken exactly the same except for length of one segment are considered a minimal pair.

The International Phonetic Alphabet (IPA) denotes length by doubling the letter or by diacritics above or after the letters:

American English does not have minimal pairs indicating the existence of chronemes or may theoretically be said to have only one chroneme. Some other dialects such as Australian English have contrastive vowel length, but it is not analysed as the consequence of a chroneme.

Many Indo-European languages, including Classical Latin, have distinctive length in consonants, for example in Italian:

Japanese, some Italian dialects, and Thai have distinctive length in vowels. For example, in Thai:

See, for example, the cŭ/cū minimal pair in the dialect spoken near Palmi, Calabria (Italy):

or a more general example for the Sicilian language as a whole:

Almost all Uralic languages, such as Finnish, Hungarian and Estonian have a distinctive moraic chroneme as a phoneme (also arguably called archiphoneme or epenthetic vowel/consonant). The etymology of the vocalic chroneme has been traced to a voiced velar fricative in the hypothetical Proto-Uralic language, such that  becomes . For example, taka- "back-", takka "fireplace" and taakka "burden" are unrelated words. It is also grammatically important; the third person marker is a chroneme (menee "s/he goes"), and often in the spoken Finnish of the Helsinki area there are grammatical minimal pairs, e.g. nominative Stadi "Helsinki" vs. partitive Stadii.

In Finnish, Estonian and Sami languages, there are also two allophonic lengths of the chroneme, half-long and over-long. For example, Finnish imperative anna! "give!" has a short vowel, oma "own" has a half-long vowel, and Annaa (partitive case of the name Anna) has an overlong vowel (without any distinctive tonal variation to distinguish these three). Estonian and Sami also have a three-way distinction in consonants, e.g. lina "bed sheet", linna (half-long 'n')  "of the city", linna (over-long 'n') "to the city". Estonian, in which the phonemic opposition is the strongest, uses tonal contour as a secondary cue to distinguish the two; "over-long" is falling as in other Finnic languages, but "half-long" is rising.

Finnish also denotes stress principally by adding more length (approximately 100 ms) to the vowel of the syllable nucleus. This means that Finnish has five different physical lengths. (The half-long vowel is a phonemically short vowel appearing in the second syllable, if the first—and thus stressed—syllable is a single short vowel.) The unstressed short vowels are about 40 ms in physical duration, the unstressed long vowels about 70 ms. The stress adds about 100 ms, giving short stressed as 130–150 ms and long stressed as 170–180 ms. The half-long vowel, which is always short unstressed, is distinctively longer than the standard 40 ms.

Japanese is another language in which vowel length is distinctive. For example, biru is a foreign loan word (clipped from a longer form) that means "building" whereas bīru is a foreign loan word for "beer". Using a notion intuitive to a speaker of Japanese, it could be said that more than anything, what differentiates bīru from biru is an extra mora (or minimal vowel syllable) in the speech rhythm that signifies a lengthening of the vowel . However, upon observation one might also note a rise in pitch and intensity of the longer vowel. It could be said, also, that vowel lengthening—chronemic contrasts—nearly doubles Japanese's rather small inventory of vowel phonemes (though the occurrence of diphthongs also augments vowel counts). Due to native literacy practices, Japanese long vowels are often thought of as sequences of two vowels of the same quality (rather than one vowel of a greater quantity or length) since that is how they are sometimes written.

In the case of consonants of Japanese, if treated phonemically, a medial consonant might appear to double, thus creating a contrast, for example, between the word hiki (meaning 'pull' or 'influence') and hikki (meaning 'writing'). In effect, this consonant doubling then adds one mora to the overall speech rhythm and timing. Hence, among other contrasts, the word hik-ki is felt to be one mora or beat longer than hi-ki by a speaker of Japanese.

See also
 Emic and etic
 Morpheme
 Phoneme

References

Suomi, Kari. Temporal conspiracies for a tonal end: Segmental durations and accentual f0 movement in a quantity language. Journal of Phonetics, Volume 33, Issue 3, July 2005, pp. 291–309.
Phonetics of Finnish: Quantity and duration of vowels & consonants

External links
 

Phonology